Sretko Vuksanović (born 15 February 1973) is a Bosnian retired professional footballer and manager.

Playing career

Club
He started his playing career with FK Sarajevo, before transferring to city rivals FK Željezničar in 1991. With the start of the Bosnian war he made a move to Ligue 1 side FC Sochaux. He also played for K.A.A. Gent, RC Genk and R. Cappellen F.C. in the Belgian Pro League, and Pau FC and Sporting Toulon in France. After a short stint with Željezničar in 2004, he joined FK Slavija Sarajevo where he concluded his career in 2009.

Managerial career
In 2012, he was named manager of Republika Srpska team FK Romanija.

References 

1973 births
Living people
Footballers from Sarajevo
Serbs of Bosnia and Herzegovina
Association football midfielders
Yugoslav footballers
Bosnia and Herzegovina footballers
FK Sarajevo players
FC Sochaux-Montbéliard players
K.A.A. Gent players
K.R.C. Genk players
Royal Cappellen F.C. players
Pau FC players
SC Toulon players
FK Željezničar Sarajevo players
FK Slavija Sarajevo players
Yugoslav First League players
Ligue 1 players
Belgian Pro League players
Challenger Pro League players
Premier League of Bosnia and Herzegovina players
Bosnia and Herzegovina expatriate footballers
Expatriate footballers in France
Bosnia and Herzegovina expatriate sportspeople in France
Expatriate footballers in Belgium
Bosnia and Herzegovina expatriate sportspeople in Belgium
Bosnia and Herzegovina football managers